SAH may refer to:

People with the surname 
 Chih-Tang Sah, American engineer

Places 
 Sah, Iran, a village in Semnan Province
 Sah, Mali, a village in the Mopti Region
 Sah, Yemen

Transport 
 Sana'a International Airport's IATA code
 San Hui stop's MTR station code
 Sayakhat Airlines' ICAO code

Other uses
 Sah (god), an Ancient Egyptian god
 Sah, an Ancient Egyptian concept of the soul
 S-adenosyl homocysteine, an amino acid derivative
 Sakha language (ISO 639-2 code)
 Savage Aural Hotbed, a band in Minneapolis, Minnesota, US
 Shabab Al Sahel FC, a Lebanese association football club
 Society of Architectural Historians
 Subarachnoid hemorrhage, bleeding into an area surrounding the brain

See also 
SAHS (disambiguation)